Eduard Malchenko (born 24 November 1986) is a Russian high jumper.

He is mainly known as the gold medalist at the 2009 Summer Universiade. He also finished eighth at the 2011 Summer Universiade.

References

1986 births
Living people
Russian male high jumpers
Universiade medalists in athletics (track and field)
Universiade gold medalists for Russia
Competitors at the 2011 Summer Universiade
Medalists at the 2009 Summer Universiade